Noshad Alamiyan Darounkolaei  (born 21 November 1991 in Babol) is an Iranian table tennis player.

Noshad Alamiyan made a breakthrough at 2008 ITTF World Junior Championships held in Madrid, Spain by beating junior world no. 1 Kenta Matsudaira; despite being coachless he finished 5th overall.

He won the 2009 Doha Junior Open, as part of the ITTF Junior Circuit beating Paraguayan Marcelo Aguirre in the final, 4–3.

He also won a bronze medal in doubles event at the WTT contender series Qatar 2021.

In 2012 and 2016, he played in the Summer Olympics.

He has won a bronze medal in 2018 Asian Games Jakarta Indonesia in single event after 52 years after beating Wung Chun Ting from Hong Kong.

His younger brother, Nima, is table tennis player too.

Best results 
 2013 – Asian Cup: 4th place
 2012 – Asian Cup: 4th place
 2012 – World Tour Kuwait: Winner U-21
 2011 – Asian Cup China: 6th place
 2010 – Asian Cup China: 11th place
 2009 – World Junior Circuit Portugal: Runner-up
 2009 – World Junior Circuit Qatar: Winner
 2009 – World Junior Circuit Manama: Runner-up
 2008 – World Junior Circuit Qatar: Winner
 2018 – Asian Games: Bronze Medal

Major results

References

External links
 
 
 
 
 
 
 
Noshad alamiyan Instagram

1991 births
Living people
Iranian male table tennis players
Olympic table tennis players of Iran
Table tennis players at the 2012 Summer Olympics
Table tennis players at the 2016 Summer Olympics
Table tennis players at the 2010 Asian Games
Table tennis players at the 2014 Asian Games
Table tennis players at the 2018 Asian Games
Asian Games medalists in table tennis
Asian Games bronze medalists for Iran
Medalists at the 2018 Asian Games
People from Babol
Islamic Solidarity Games competitors for Iran
Sportspeople from Mazandaran province
20th-century Iranian people
21st-century Iranian people